Joseph Depew (July 11, 1912 – October 30, 1988) was an American television director and producer and actor.

Career
Born in Harrison, New Jersey, Depew began his career as a child stage actor at the age of three. He was influenced by his mother, also a stage performer. He later worked as a second unit director or an assistant director in 22 films and 26 television series episodes. He was a unit director in six The Beverly Hillbillies episodes, an actor in 14 films, an assistant producer in 11 episodes of The Bob Cummings Show and a production manager in one movie.

Personal life and death
Depew was married to Dorothy Depew. They had eight children: David, Judy, Donald, John, Joan, Deb, Jim, and Diane. On October 30, 1988, Depew died at the age of 76 in Escondido, California.

Selected filmography

References

External links

1912 births
1988 deaths
People from Harrison, New Jersey
Male actors from New Jersey
American male child actors
Film producers from California
American male silent film actors
American male stage actors
American male television actors
Television producers from California
People from Escondido, California
Film directors from California
20th-century American male actors
20th-century American businesspeople
Film directors from New Jersey
Film producers from New Jersey
Television producers from New Jersey